In dermatology, granular parakeratosis (also known as axillary granular parakeratosis, intertriginous granular parakeratosis, and more recently, zombie patch) is a cutaneous condition characterized by brownish-red keratotic papules that can coalesce into plaques.

See also 
 Pityriasis rubra pilaris
 List of cutaneous conditions

References 

Papulosquamous hyperkeratotic cutaneous conditions